Classmates Minus  is a 2020 Taiwanese dark political comedy-drama film written and directed by Huang Hsin-yao, and starring Shih Ming-shuai, Cheng Jen-shuo, Nadow Lin, Liu Kuan-ting and Chen Yi-wen. The film was screened at the 57th Golden Horse Awards on November 5, 2020, and it had seen a theatrical release in Taiwan on the 20th of the same month. It was available for streaming worldwide via Netflix on February 20, 2021.

Synopsis
Four school buddies — a director, a temp worker, an insurance salesman and a paper craftsman — grapple with unfulfilled dreams amid middle age ennui.

Cast
Shih Ming-shuai as Tom
Cheng Jen-shuo as Fan Man
Nadow Lin as Tin Can
Liu Kuan-ting as Lee Hung-chang
Chen Yi-wen as Congressman Gao
Lotus Wang as A-Yue
Ada Pan as Minus
Jennifer Hung Shiao-ling as A-Zen
Jacqueline Zhu as A-Zhi
Evelyn Zheng Yu-tong as Valérie

Awards and nominations

References

External links
 
 
 

2020s Mandarin-language films
2020 black comedy films
Taiwanese black comedy films
Taiwanese drama films
Political drama films
Films based on Taiwanese novels